Velden is a town in the district Nürnberger Land, in Bavaria, Germany. It is situated on the river Pegnitz, 16 km south of the town Pegnitz, and 36 km northeast of Nuremberg (centre).

References

Nürnberger Land